The following is a list of selected recordings by Perry Como (all on RCA Victor except where Ted Weems orchestra is referenced; in those cases, on Decca):

References

Como, Perry